Quote is a Dutch magazine with editorial offices based in Amsterdam, notable for publishing the Quote 500, a list of the 500 wealthiest people in the Netherlands together with their relative financial position, similar to the list produced by Forbes.

Quote is published monthly and provides information about business, money, careers, networks and lives of people at the top. In December 1999, the magazine was named "Magazine of the Year" by the Nederlandse Uitgeversbond (Dutch Publishers Association). First published in November 1986, and named for a term for a stock price, Quote was sold by the founder, Maarten van den Biggelaar, and two friends to Hachette Filipacchi Médias (HFM) on July 21, 2006. Chief editor Jort Kelder then stepped down in April 2007 after more than thirteen years at the helm.

In November 2002, Quote published the first picture of real estate speculator Willem Endstra together with released felon Willem Holleeder, who had served a prison sentence as the convicted kidnapper of beer magnate Alfred Heineken. The two were sitting on a bench outside Endstra's offices in the Amsterdam Oud-Zuid borough. Endstra, who had always denied his links with the underworld, filed for a preliminary injunction demanding that Quote be withdrawn from sale. He said he feared for his safety. Initially, his claim was upheld, but a few days later the injunction was overturned. Endstra was murdered two years later, and Holleeder was reimprisoned after having been convicted on a charge of extortion.

In November 2003, the editor of Quote was shot; the culprit was never found. A few days earlier, the home of Van den Biggelaar was shot at as well.

In January 2005, Quote was in the headlines with a claim that in 1998, Nina Brink, the founder of World Online, a Dutch Internet service provider, had been involved in a premeditated sex scandal and was forced to resign. Brink announced that she would take legal action, but failed to bring a lawsuit. A declaration that she subsequently filed with the Amsterdam public prosecutor to support her libel claim was declared inadmissible in May due to the lack of solid legal basis.

On 1 November 2011, Mirjam van den Broeke succeeded Sjoerd van Stokkum as the new editor. Former editor Jort Kelder temporarily returned to the business magazine as advisor to the new editor. Since November 2016 Sander Schimmelpenninck has been the editor.

Copies 
Total paid circulation, as verified by Het Oplage Instituut (HOI), the Dutch institute for media auditing, affiliated with Audit Bureau of Circulations
 2000: 36,663
 2010: 48,181
 2011: 51,227
 2012: 51,515

References

External links
 Website of  Quote 
 ISSN 0920-8275

1986 establishments in the Netherlands
Business magazines published in the Netherlands
Dutch-language magazines
Magazines established in 1986
Magazines published in Amsterdam
Monthly magazines published in the Netherlands